Count Hieronymus Lauweryn or Jerome Laurinus of Watervliet was a courtier at the court of Philip the Handsome, (Lord of the Netherlands and Duke of Burgundy then briefly King of Castile) to whom Lauweryn was treasurer. He was also a courtier at the courts of Maximilian I, Holy Roman Emperor, and of Margaret of Austria. Of common origins, the lordship of Watervliet was awarded to Hieronymus by Philip in 1507. He married twice His son Matthias Lauweryn, or Matthias Laurinus (d.1540), the second lord of Watervliet, was well known to Erasmus. He was responsible for the construction of the Church of Our Lady's Ascension in Watervliet.

He is primarily remembered for having commissioned a chansonnier,  which is named after him, around 1505/6 in Bruges. His chansonnier contains works by Alexander Agricola, Loyset Compère, Jean Mouton and Josquin. The songs are composed in various languages, comprising 36 French, and 25 Dutch, 14 Latin and 2 Italian works. Finally there is one Latin-French double-texted motet-chanson.

An edition of the chansonnier, with an introduction by W. McMurtry, was published by Alamire Music Publishers in 1989, and a selection of songs, including all Dutch songs, of the chansonnier recorded on 2 CDs by the Egidius Kwartet in 2007.

References

Belgian patrons of music